The Estadio Municipal de Butarque is a multi-use stadium located in Leganés, Spain. 
It is currently used for football matches and is the home stadium of CD Leganés.

History and characteristics
The stadium shares its name (Butarque) with that of the main water stream passing through Leganés, with that of the patron saint of the municipality, and with that of a public park in the stadium's surroundings. The stadium was built between 1997 and 1998 with the aim to replace the old field in the city, the Estadio Luis Rodríguez de Miguel. Butarque was inaugurated on 14 February 1998, with a game between Leganés and Xerez.

With an original capacity of 8,138, Butarque was expanded to 10,954 seats divided into four sectors after Leganés’ promotion to La Liga in 2016.

On 29 April 2016, the mayor of Leganés suggested an expansion of Butarque to 12,000 seats and also access improvements to the stadium.

The stadium has a capacity of 12,454 spectators following the latest expansion. 

Butarque, apart from football matches, has hosted musical concerts and festivals like Festimad.

References

External links
Stadiumguide profile 
CD Leganés profile on Futbolme 
Estadios de España 

Football venues in the Community of Madrid
CD Leganés
Sports venues completed in 1998
Buildings and structures in Leganés
Sport in Leganés